Birkbeck Court is the oldest and largest student residence at University of Strathclyde, and was constructed between 1972 and 1974.  It is situated on Cathedral Street, which is at the very centre of Glasgow and the university campus.
The halls are made of 16 blocks, each block containing 4 flats which is residence to 6 students. The students have a room to themselves which is also their study area. Unlike a few of the Halls of Residence, Birkbeck court does not have en-suite facilities. There is a shower room with two sinks and a separate toilet room which also contains a sink.

The Halls are situated on Strathclyde's John Anderson Campus. This is also the home to most of the lecture theatres, which makes the commute to classes much easier. The campus is in the centre of Glasgow so there is easy access to shops and entertainment facilities.

Security
The students have three keys that are necessary for them to access their flat and room. First of all there is a key to get into the flat block. Thereafter a key has to be used to get into the flat and a further key needs to be used to gain access into their study bedroom. The students can lock their room at their own will and it will be at their own risk. The Halls of Residence have a 24-hour security surveillance system. And cars need permission to enter the village. If there are any problems then students are able to walk to the village office which is situated in the centre of the student village. Here they are able to answer most questions. If a student is to lock themselves out of their room or flat in the early hours of the morning they are able to go to a night porter. Here they will have to show their student matriculation card to verify who they are and somebody will come and open their room up for them.

Living Area
The six students living in the flat have a shared living area. This consists of a kitchen, seating area and dining area, this is all open plan and of a reasonable size. The kitchen is well equipped. The students do have to bring their own cooking utensils and cleaning products. Every flat in Birkbeck court is the same and the living area can comfortably sit six people. This consists of 2 sofas, four stools and a television. The dining area is fairly small as it is a small breakfast bar with a few chairs, so not all students can eat together. The living area is sociable and enables the students to interact and have a fun time.

Bedroom/Study

The Bedroom/Study is decorated in a plain tasteful way. The walls are painted a pale green/blue (depending what block you are in). There are pin boards on each wall so you are allowed to have your own decoration, to make it homely. Each room contains a single bed, a double wardrobe and a desk with desk chair. There are three shelves on the wall for books etc. In addition to the wardrobe, underneath the bed there are two reasonable sized drawers for extra storage. The furniture is well dated and not too old.

Rooms do not have televisions, although there are connection points if you wish to have one. There is a television in the shared living room however. If you do take one, and intend to watch TV programmes as they are broadcast, then you must make sure you have a television licence. If you are only using the TV as a monitor then no licence is required. There is an in room phone which can be used to communicate with other members of Birkbeck Court or to security if you need. Each room has an internet connection point so that students are able to surf the internet at 24 hours. The price of the internet is included in the rent.

Notable residents

George Knox

Additional information
The cleaner will come once a week and will clean the shared area. This includes the living area and shower and toilet. The students are own their own when it comes to their room cleaning. The flats get inspected once a semester and if not up to standard then necessary implications will be put in place for the flat in whom it concerns.

The halls are about an 8-minute walk from the University of Strathclyde Students' Association. This is the largest student union in Scotland at it has 7 floors consisting of bars, clubs, a pool room, restaurants, cafés, study areas and a bank. The student union is where most of the freshers week activities take place.

The halls of residence are right next to the University's book shop which is useful for new students to find exactly what they are needing.

The flats do not have a washing machine or dryer. Through the student village there are laundry rooms in which the students can wash and dry their clothes. This is at a charge though and students must have their own detergent.

References

External links
 Strathclyde Homepage
 Living in Halls
 Accommodation Information
 Review
 Additional Information

University of Strathclyde